Wigg is an English surname. Notable people with the surname include:

Alexz Wigg (born 1989), English motorcycle racer
Alfred Edgar Wigg (1857–1914), Australian surgeon
Charles Mayes Wigg (1889–1969), English artist
Edgar Smith Wigg (1818–1899), Australian stationer 
Edward Neale Wigg (1847–1927), Australian publisher and businessman
George Wigg, Baron Wigg (1900–1983), British politician
Lilly Wigg (1749–1828), English botanist
Montagu Stone-Wigg (1861–1918), Anglican bishop
Ron Wigg (1949–1997), English footballer
Simon Wigg (1960–2000), English motorcycle racer

See also
Olaf Wiig, New Zealand journalist, victim of 2006 Fox journalists kidnapping
 Wigg (disambiguation)
 Wiggs (surname)

English-language surnames